Lord George Cavendish may refer to:

Lord George Cavendish (d. 1794), MP
Lord George Cavendish (1810–1880), MP
George Cavendish, 1st Earl of Burlington (1754–1834), known as Lord George Cavendish until 1831, politician